St. Anthony College was a bachelor's degree-granting seminary college in Hudson, New Hampshire, that provided a foundation for men preparing for service in the Capuchin order of friars. The college offered a program in philosophy leading to the B.A. degree.

The college was operated by the Capuchin Province of St. Mary, founded in 1952 and spanning New York and New England. It was located at St. Anthony Friary in Hudson, which was constructed in 1954.  The friary and college closed in 1979.

Notable alumni
 Anthony Sablan Apuron, friar; Archbishop of Agana in Guam from 1986 to 2018

See also
 Order of Friars Minor Capuchin#Other jurisdictions for information on the Province of St. Mary

References

Defunct private universities and colleges in New Hampshire
Educational institutions established in 1954
Educational institutions disestablished in 1979
1954 establishments in New Hampshire
1979 disestablishments in New Hampshire
Hudson, New Hampshire
Order of Friars Minor Capuchin
Seminaries and theological colleges in the United States